Saïd Taghmaoui (born 19 July 1973) is a French-American actor and screenwriter. One of his major screen roles was that of Saïd in the 1995 French film La Haine, directed by Mathieu Kassovitz. Taghmaoui has also appeared in a number of English-language films, with roles such as Captain Said in Three Kings (1999), Sameer in Wonder Woman (2017), and The Elder in John Wick: Chapter 3 - Parabellum (2019).

Early life
Saïd Taghmaoui was born in Villepinte, Seine-Saint-Denis, into a large family comprising eight children; he had four brothers and three sisters. His parents were Moroccan immigrants of Berber ancestry from Essaouira. Taghmaoui grew up in the Rose des Vents quartier of the Aulnay-sous-Bois commune. He dropped out of school to become a boxer, rising as high as No. 2 in his weight class in France.

Career
He later met actor and director Mathieu Kassovitz; together, they appeared in Kassovitz's film La Haine (1995), whose plot concerns race and violence in the ghettoized banlieues of Paris. The following year, Taghmaoui was nominated for a César Award (in the Most Promising Actor category) for his performance.

He has since pursued an international career, appearing in films in Germany, Italy, Morocco and the United States (Three Kings, 1999). Taghmaoui starred in Vantage Point (2008) as the leader of a terrorist group plotting to kidnap the U.S. president. In Morocco, he appeared in Djinns (2010), a film about the Algerian War, alongside Thierry Fremont. Taghmaoui's television work includes Lost, House of Saddam and Touch. He appeared in the British film My Brother the Devil, which was released globally in 2013.

Personal life
Taghmaoui is a practising Muslim. He moved to the United States in 1999, and in 2008, obtained American citizenship.

Filmography

See also
 Maghrebian community of Paris

References

External links
 
 

1973 births
Living people
20th-century French male actors
20th-century Moroccan male actors
21st-century French male actors
21st-century Moroccan male actors
21st-century American male actors
Male actors from Paris
French male boxers
French Muslims
French expatriates in the United States
French expatriate actors
French male film actors
French male television actors
French people of Shilha descent
American people of Moroccan-Berber descent
French male screenwriters
French screenwriters
American screenwriters
French emigrants to the United States
People from Villepinte, Seine-Saint-Denis
Sportspeople from Seine-Saint-Denis
American Muslims